The Big Horn is an album by saxophonist Houston Person recorded in 1976 and released on the Muse label in 1979.

Reception

Allmusic awarded the album 4 stars noting that "Reliable soul jazz, nicely played ballads, and good standards are tenor saxophonist Houston Person's forte, and he demonstrates that repeatedly on this '76 quintet set".

Track listing 
 "Bluesology" (Milt Jackson) - 9:55  
 "This Love of Mine" (Sol Parker, Frank Sinatra,  Hank Sanicola) - 5:33  
 "Gee, Baby, Ain't I Good to You" (Andy Razaf, Don Redman) - 5:27  
 "The More I See You" (Harry Warren, Mack Gordon) - 6:50  
 "Memories of You" (Andy Razaf, Eubie Blake) - 4:18  
 "I Concentrate on You" (Cole Porter) - 11:00

Personnel 
Houston Person - tenor saxophone 
Cedar Walton - piano
Buster Williams - bass
Grady Tate - drums
Buddy Caldwell - congas

References 

Houston Person albums
1979 albums
Muse Records albums
Albums produced by Michael Cuscuna